Páez is a Spanish surname. Notable people with the surname include:

Arts
 Agó Páez (born 1954), Uruguayan plastic artist
 Alex Paez (born 1963), American actor, musician, and restaurateur
 Carlos Páez Rodríguez (born 1953), Uruguayan air crash survivor, son of Carlos Páez Vilaró
 Carlos Páez Vilaró (1923–2014), Uruguayan artist and writer
 Fito Páez (born 1963), Argentine singer
 Francisco Páez (singer), Guatemalan singer and songwriter
 Francisco Páez de la Cadena (born 1951), Spanish garden historian
 Pia Páez, Venezuelan singer-songwriter

Sports
 Antonio Páez (born 1956), Spanish middle distance runner
 Anthony Paez (born 1984), American basketball player
 Azriel Páez (born 1989), Mexican boxer, son of Jorge Páez
 Francisco Páez (swimmer), Venezuelan swimmer
 Hector Páez (born 1982), Colombian cross-country mountain biker
 Jorge Páez (born 1965), Mexican boxer, actor, and circus performer
 Jorge Páez, Jr. (born 1987), Mexican boxer
 Robert Páez (born 1994), Venezuelan diver
 Ron Paez (born 1931), Australian rules football player
 Verónica Páez (born 1974), Argentine marathon runner

Association football
 Ariel Páez (born 1984), Chilean midfielder
 Carlos Paez (born 1978), Honduran midfielder
 Gaspar Páez (born 1986), Argentine footballer
 Guillermo Páez (born 1945), Chilean footballer
 Gustavo Páez (born 1990), Venezuelan forward
 Javier Páez (born 1975), Argentine defender
 Luis Alfonso Páez (born 1986), Colombian forward
 Luis Fernando Páez (born 1989), Paraguayan forward
 Mauro Andrés Manotas Páez (born 1995), Colombian forward
 Rafael Páez (born 1994), Spanish defender
 Raúl Páez (born 1936), Argentine defender
 Ricardo David Páez (born 1979), Venezuelan midfielder
 Richard Páez (born 1952), Venezuelan manager
 Sebastián Páez (born 1983), Chilean midfielder
 Sergio Ariel Páez (born 1981), Argentine midfielder

Others
 Federico Páez (1876–1974), President of Ecuador 1935–1937
 José Antonio Páez (1790–1873), Venezuelan independence leader and president
 Juan Paez de Castro (1512–1570), Spanish Jesuit priest
 Oscar Páez Garcete (1937–2016), Paraguayan Roman Catholic bishop
 Pedro Páez (1564–1622), Spanish Jesuit missionary in Ethiopia
 Richard Paez (born 1947), U.S. federal judge
 Pablo Martín Páez Gavira (born 2004), Spanish footballer